Stanton Middle School is the name of multiple schools.

Stanton Middle School (Kent, Ohio)
Stanton Middle School (Wilmington, Delaware)
Stanton Middle School, Stanton, Suffolk, England.